A number of vessels of the People's Liberation Army Navy have borne the name Jinan, after the capital Jinan.

 , a Type 051 destroyer. Now a museum ship in Qingdao.
 , a Type 052C destroyer, in service since 2014.

References 

People's Liberation Army Navy ship names